Bryan Andrew MacLean (September 25, 1946 – December 25, 1998) was an American singer, guitarist and songwriter, best known for his work with the influential rock band Love. His famous compositions for Love include "Alone Again Or", "Old Man" and "Orange Skies".

Early life
Bryan MacLean's mother was an artist and a dancer, and his father was an architect for Hollywood celebrities such as Elizabeth Taylor and Dean Martin. Neighbor Frederick Loewe, of the songwriting team Lerner & Loewe, recognized him as a "melodic genius" at the age of three as he doodled on the piano. His early influences were Billie Holiday and George Gershwin, although he confessed to an obsession with Elvis Presley. During his childhood, he wore out show music records from Guys and Dolls, Oklahoma, South Pacific and West Side Story. His first girlfriend was Liza Minnelli, and they would sit at the piano together singing songs from The Wizard of Oz (1939). He learned to swim in Elizabeth Taylor's pool, and his father's good friend was actor Robert Stack. MacLean appears in the 1957 Cary Grant film An Affair to Remember, singing in the Deborah Kerr character's music class. Maria McKee is his half-sister.

At 17, MacLean heard the Beatles: "Before the Beatles I had been into folk music. I had wanted to be an artist in the bohemian tradition, where we would sit around with banjos and do folk music, but when I saw A Hard Day's Night everything changed. I let my hair grow out and I got kicked out of high school."

Music career
MacLean started playing guitar professionally in 1963. He got a job at the Balladeer in West Hollywood, playing folk and blues guitar. The following year, the club changed its name to the Troubadour. His regular set routine was a mixture of Appalachian folk songs and Delta blues, and he also frequently covered Robert Johnson's "Cross Road Blues". It was there he met Gene Clark and Roger McGuinn, the founding musicians of the Byrds, when they were rehearsing as a duo. MacLean also became good friends with David Crosby. During that time, MacLean also became friends with songwriter Sharon Sheeley, who fixed him up on his first date with singer Jackie DeShannon.

With MacLean as equipment manager, the Byrds went on the road to promote their first single, "Mr. Tambourine Man". By the time the Byrds left for their first UK tour, MacLean was left behind and very disappointed.

After an unsuccessful audition for a role in The Monkees, MacLean got into a car on the Sunset Strip that Arthur Lee was driving. Lee's band, the Grass Roots (not to be confused with the popular rock band of the same name), was the house band at a club called the Brave New World. Lee knew that the colorful dancers and scene that had followed the Byrds would follow MacLean if he joined Lee's band, so Lee had MacLean sit in with them at the Brave New World.

The Grass Roots
The members of the Grass Roots were Lee (vocals, harmonica, guitar, keyboards, drums), Johnny Echols (lead guitar, vocals), Johnny Fleckenstein (bass), Don Conka (drums), and MacLean (rhythm guitar, vocals). Despite the success of Lee and the others at the Los Angeles club, another L.A. band led by P. F. Sloan was first to record under the name the Grass Roots, which spurred Lee to change the name of his band to Love.

Love

Jac Holzman's Elektra Records signed Love, and they had a minor hit with their version of the Bacharach/David tune "My Little Red Book" from their March 1966 debut album, Love, to which MacLean contributed the song "Softly to Me", as well as co-writing two other songs. He also contributed the Byrds' arrangement of "Hey Joe", which he performed live, singing the lead vocal on the record. Later that year, Love hit No. 33 on the US national chart with their proto-punk single "7 and 7 Is", followed by their second album in November, Da Capo, featuring MacLean's "Orange Skies".

Despite their early success, by mid-1967, Love's "classic" lineup was already falling apart, due to a combination of factors including internal tensions, complacency, lack of rehearsals, drug use, the growing creative rivalry between Lee and MacLean (MacLean was increasingly unhappy with Lee's domination of the songwriting), and Lee's refusal to tour or travel to promote their records. However, this lineup held together long enough to create their third (and final) album, Forever Changes (1967), which is considered one of the finest rock albums ever: it reached No. 40 on Rolling Stone magazine's list of the Top 500 Albums of All Time (2003); No. 6 on the NME'''s 100 Best Albums of All Time (2003) and No. 37 on their 500 Greatest Albums of All Time (2013); and No. 11 on Virgin's All-Time Top 1000 Albums (2000). It was entered into the National Recording Registry in May 2012.

Much of the credit for the completion of Forever Changes is due to co-producer Bruce Botnick. After early sessions stalled due to the group's lack of rehearsal and preparation, Botnick hired several members of the legendary L.A. session musician collective "the Wrecking Crew" to record with Lee and MacLean on two tracks, a tactic that effectively spurred the proper group back into action. After a brief period of intensive rehearsals, Love returned to the studio and completed the remaining cuts for the album in just 64 hours.

MacLean's "Alone Again Or" is the album's opening track, with MacLean and Lee providing co-lead vocals. "Alone Again Or" was the sole single released from the album to appear on the Billboard singles chart, backed with Lee's "A House Is Not a Motel". A remixed mono version of "Alone Again Or" was released as a promo single by Elektra in 1970. "Alone Again Or" initially peaked at No. 123 in 1968 in an edited version, while the longer, original album version spent three weeks on the singles chart in 1970 before peaking at No. 99, according to Joel Whitburn's Top Pop Singles: 1955-2010 (2011). In 2010, "Alone Again Or" came in at No. 442 in a poll of the 500 greatest songs of all time conducted by Rolling Stone magazine (it was No. 436 in the 2004 poll). It has been covered by many notable acts, including UFO, Calexico, the Damned, and a collaboration between Matthew Sweet and Susanna Hoffs.

Spiritual conversion and solo music career
MacLean was offered a solo contract with Elektra after the dissolution of Love, but his demo offerings were rejected by the label and the contract lapsed. Subsequently, he wrote a film score that was not used. Thereafter, he tried without success to record an album for Capitol Records in New York. "I was alone in a hotel room in New York and I had lost practically everything", MacLean was quoted as saying. "It occurred to me that I was in a tail-spin so I thought 'hell, why don't I pray?' So I did, and nothing happened for about two or three weeks. At the end of that time, I was sitting in a drug store on 3rd Avenue having a drink, and suddenly the drink turned to sand in my mouth. I left the bar and when I reached the pavement and the daylight I knew something had changed. From that point on my life has been totally different."

Bryan joined a Christian ministry called the Vineyard, the same church that Bob Dylan later joined. During Friday night Bible readings, MacLean took the concert part of the session and was so amazed at the money he received that he gradually assembled a catalogue of his Christian songs. His next move was to open a Christian nightclub in Beverly Hills called the Daisy. When it closed in 1976, MacLean considered going full-time into the ministry but decided once again to devote himself to music.

He played an unsuccessful reunion with Lee in 1978 on two dates but wasn't paid, so he turned down an offer for a UK tour, which was to have been billed as the "original" Love. The Bryan MacLean Band got a gig supporting Lee's Love at the Whisky in 1982. MacLean also worked with his half-sister Maria McKee and wrote the song "Don't Toss Us Away" for the debut album of her band Lone Justice.

Around 1996, MacLean's Elektra Records demo tapes were discovered by his mother Elizabeth in the family garage, and after two years of persistent shopping around to record companies, a deal was struck with Sundazed, who in 1997 released the CD Ifyoubelievein. In the album's liner notes, Rolling Stones David Fricke wrote that the collection was, "in a sense, the Love record that never was: solo demos and home recordings of fourteen original MacLean songs, all written in the earliest and most vital years of Love and all but three virtually unheard in any form since MacLean wrote them".

MacLean added:

"The music that is presented in this collection was written decades ago, when I was in the band Love, and was written with that band in mind, and had been intended to be performed by, and associated with the band, Love. I firmly believe that if things had been the other way around, by now, you probably would've already heard a great deal, if not all of what is assembled here. For one thing, I would've stuck around the band a lot longer, not feeling the frustration of having such a backlog of unpublished, and unperformed material, and the natural unfulfilled desire for recognition, or even vindication."
—Liner notes of Ifyoubelievein, 1997

Death
MacLean then completed a spiritual album of Christian music and was about to record another album when he died of a heart attack in a Los Angeles area restaurant on Christmas Day 1998.

DiscographyWith Love1966: Love
1966: Da Capo
1967: Forever ChangesSolo1997: Ifyoubelievein
2000: Candy's Waltz
2005: Praise & Worship
2007: Intra Muros
2010: My New SongWith Maria McKee'2005: No One Was Kinder''

References

External links

Bryan MacLean obituaries

1946 births
1998 deaths
Songwriters from California
American rock guitarists
American male guitarists
Love (band) members
Singers from Los Angeles
Protopunk musicians
Converts to Christianity
American performers of Christian music
20th-century American singers
Appalachian music
20th-century American guitarists
Guitarists from Los Angeles
20th-century American male singers
American male songwriters